Sakura Genesis 2018 was a professional wrestling event promoted by New Japan Pro-Wrestling (NJPW), which took place on April 1, 2018, in Tokyo at Ryōgoku Kokugikan. The main event featured the 2018 New Japan Cup winner Zack Sabre Jr. challenging Kazuchika Okada for the IWGP Heavyweight Championship. Previously held under the Invasion Attack name, this marked the second show under the Sakura Genesis name.

Storylines

Sakura Genesis 2018 will feature professional wrestling matches that involved different wrestlers from pre-existing scripted feuds and storylines. Wrestlers portrayed villains, heroes, or less distinguishable characters in the scripted events that built tension and culminated in a wrestling match or series of matches.

On March 21, 2018, Zack Sabre Jr. won the New Japan Cup after defeating Hiroshi Tanahashi in the final. Sabre Jr. had previously beaten Tetsuya Naito in the first round on March 11, Kota Ibushi in the second round on March 15, and Sanada in the semifinals on March 18. Since the winner of the New Japan Cup gets to challenge for the NEVER Openweight Championship, IWGP Intercontinental Championship, or IWGP Heavyweight Championship, Sabre Jr. decided to challenge Kazuchika Okada for the Heavyweight Title after his finals match. The match is set to happen on Sakura Genesis.

On the second night of The New Beginning in Sapporo, Roppongi 3K (Sho and Yoh) won the IWGP Junior Heavyweight Tag Team Championship. They would lose the titles to Suzuki-gun (El Desperado and Yoshinobu Kanemaru) on the NJPW 46th Anniversary Show in a triple threat involving Los Ingobernables de Japón (Bushi and Hiromu Takahashi). Bushi and Takahashi would be in matches against Suzuki-gun multiple times after the Anniversary Show, much to Roppongi 3K's chagrin. This would lead to post-match attacks by Bushi and Takahashi on Desperado and Kanemaru, leading to Roppongi 3K coming to stop the fighting and asserting their spot as the next challengers for the championship. On March 23, NJPW made the triple threat rematch official.

Results

References

External links
The official New Japan Pro-Wrestling website

2018 in professional wrestling
2018 in Tokyo
Events in Tokyo
April 2018 events in Japan
2018
Professional wrestling in Tokyo